The 920th Aircraft Control and Warning Squadron is an inactive United States Air Force unit. It was last assigned to the Goose Air Defense Sector, Air Defense Command, stationed at Resolution Island Air Station, Northern Territories, Canada. It was inactivated on 1 November 1961.

The unit was a General Surveillance Radar squadron providing for the air defense of North America.

Lineage
 Constituted 15 October 1951 as the 920th Aircraft Control and Warning Squadron
 Activated on 1 November 1951
 Inactivated on 1 November 1961

Assignments
 152d Aircraft Control and Warning Group (NEAC), 1 November 1951
 64th Air Division (NEAC), 19 January 1952
 4733d Air Defense Group (ADC), 1 April 1957
 4732d Air Defense Group, 1 May 1958
 Goose Air Defense Sector, 1 April 1960 – 1 November 1961

Stations
 Grenier AFB, New Hampshire, 1 November 1951
McAndrew AFB, Newfoundland, Canada, 19 January 1952
 Resolution Island AS, Northern Territories, Canada ca. 30 June 1953 - 1 November 1961

References

 Cornett, Lloyd H. and Johnson, Mildred W., A Handbook of Aerospace Defense Organization  1946 - 1980,  Office of History, Aerospace Defense Center, Peterson AFB, CO (1980).

Radar squadrons of the United States Air Force
Military units and formations disestablished in 1961